Hooghly Lok Sabha constituency is one of the 543 parliamentary constituencies in India. The constituency centres on Hugli-Chuchura in West Bengal. All the seven assembly segments of No. 28 Hooghly Lok Sabha constituency are in Hooghly district.

Overview

Hoogly constituency, shares a large industrial area on the western bank of the Hooghly river in the district with Sreerampur and has a rich agricultural hinterland.

According to The Statesman, "The Hooghly Lok Sabha constituency had remained a Communist bastion till the Trinamul snatched their thunder in the 2009 General Election. The constituency has the distinction of having a rich colonial history with the Portuguese settlement at Bandel, the French colony at Chandannagore, the Danish settlement at Serampore… and Chinsurah, a former Dutch colony. Despite ruling West Bengal for 35 years, the Marxist government alienated its people by such historical blunders as the forcible acquisition of fertile agricultural land in Singur which forms part of the Hooghly constituency."

The Dunlop tyre plant at Sahaganj, in this constituency is closed. According to Hindustan Times, "The entire jute industry, with eight mills in Hooghly, is sick…From Tribeni in north to Hind Motor in south, by the bank of Hooghly exists the Hooghly industrial belt, now seeking oxygen. Two fertiliser units, one food processing unit, two cotton mills, one steel plant and many other small and medium scale units have closed down over the years."

Assembly segments
As per order of the Delimitation Commission issued in 2006 in respect of the delimitation of constituencies in the West Bengal, parliamentary constituency no. 28 Hooghly is composed of the following segments:

Prior to delimitation, Hooghly Lok Sabha constituency was composed of the following assembly segments:Chandernagore (assembly constituency no. 182), Singur (assembly constituency no. 183), Haripal (assembly constituency no. 184), Chinsurah (assembly constituency no. 186), Bansberia (assembly constituency no. 193), Polba (assembly constituency no. 190), Dhaniakhali (SC) (assembly constituency no. 191)

Members of Parliament

Election results

General election 2019

General election 2014

General election 2009

General election 2004

General elections 1951-2019
Most of the contests were multi-cornered. However, only winners and runners-up are mentioned below:

See also
 List of Constituencies of the Lok Sabha

References

External links
Hooghly lok sabha  constituency election 2019 result details

Lok Sabha constituencies in West Bengal
Politics of Hooghly district